John Silver was a war pigeon active with the United States Army in World War I.   He served with distinction during World War I. He was knocked out of the air twice by cannon flak, but he got back up both times and completed his mission. He lost an eye and a leg, so he was given an eye patch and a wooden leg, hence the name "Long John Silver". He is also wearing the medal he was awarded.  , the animal is on display at the National Museum of the United States Air Force near Dayton, Ohio.

See also
 List of individual birds

References

Individual domesticated pigeons